Flight Lieutenant Maurice Hewlett Mounsdon (11 February 1918 – 6 December 2019) was a British pilot who flew with the Royal Air Force during World War II.

Service in the RAF
Maurice "Mark" Mounsdon started training on 24 August 1939 and joined 56 Squadron on 3 June 1940 during the Battle of Britain. Flying  a Hurricane, he shared in the destruction of a Dornier Do 17 bomber on 3 July and three weeks later he probably destroyed a Junkers Ju 87 "Stuka". As the battle intensified in mid-August he destroyed two Messerschmitt fighters and a probable third. He shot down or damaged about seven German aircraft before he was shot down by German fighters over Colchester on 31 August 1940. He survived but was badly burned and so spent nine months in hospitals including Black Notley and the Queen Victoria Hospital – famous for its specialist work on burns and the Guinea Pig Club.

While recovering, he served at the HQ at RAF North Weald. After the reconstructive surgery was complete, he was still rated below A1B "fit full flying" and so was posted as an instructor at RAF Bottisham and then as a flight commander at RAF Booker.  When the war ended, he was posted to 8303 Disarmament Wing, searching Germany for advanced weaponry such as jets and rockets.  After demobilisation in 1946, he returned to the engineering profession which he had started at the General Electric Company, specialising in inventions and patents such as  – "winches for use with high masts".

Life after the war
While in hospital, recovering from the burns he endured after bailing out, he married his childhood sweetheart Mary. The couple moved to the Spanish island of Menorca in the late 1970s and lived there until she died in 1993. In September 2018, for Mousdon's 100th birthday, the Red Arrows paid tribute to him with a flypast off the coast of Menorca.

Mounsdon died on 6 December 2019 at the age of 101, at the nursing home where he lived on the island of Menorca. The head of the RAF, Air Chief Marshal Michael Wigston, said that "[Mounsdon's] bravery and sacrifice should never be forgotten."

See also
List of RAF aircrew in the Battle of Britain
The Few

References

1918 births
2019 deaths
People from Lichfield
People from Menorca
Royal Air Force pilots of World War II
The Few
British centenarians
Men centenarians
20th-century English people
21st-century English people
Royal Air Force officers